Coors Field is a baseball stadium in downtown Denver, Colorado. It is the home field of Major League Baseball's Colorado Rockies. Opened in 1995, the park is located in Denver's Lower Downtown neighborhood, two blocks from Union Station. The stadium has a capacity of 50,144 people for baseball.

As an expansion team that began play in 1993, the Rockies spent their first two seasons at Mile High Stadium. During that time, Coors Field was constructed for a cost of $300 million. It includes 63 luxury suites and 4,526 club seats. Coors Field has earned a reputation as a hitter's park, due to the effect of Denver's high elevation and semi-arid climate on the distances of batted balls. To combat this, the outfield fences were positioned further away from home plate and baseballs used in the park have been pre-stored in humidors.

Coors Field has hosted the 1998 MLB All-Star Game and the 2021 MLB All-Star Game. Coors has also hosted an outdoor hockey game from the 2016 NHL Stadium Series, along with numerous concerts.

In 2017, a consultant determined that Coors Field would require $200 million in capital improvements in the 2020s. To fund those improvements, the Rockies agreed to a long-term lease to develop club-owned nearby land.

Construction
Coors Field was the first new stadium added in a six-year period in which Denver's sports venues were upgraded, along with Ball Arena and Empower Field at Mile High (originally sponsored by INVESCO). It was also the first baseball-only park in the National League since Dodger Stadium was built in 1962.

As with the other new venues, Coors Field was constructed with accessibility in mind. It sits near Interstate 25 and has direct access to the 20th Street and Park Avenue exits. Nearby Union Station also provides light rail and commuter rail access.

Coors Field was originally planned to be somewhat smaller, seating only 43,800. However, after the Rockies drew almost 4.5 million people in their first season at Mile High Stadium – the most in baseball history – the plans were altered during construction, and new seats in the right field upper deck were added.

The center field bleacher section is named "The Rockpile".  During the 1993 and 1994 seasons when the team played at Mile High Stadium, which was a hybrid football/baseball venue, the Rockpile was located next to the south stands, which were in dead center field and very distant from home plate.  The same design was incorporated into Coors Field, and is located in deep center field up high.  The original Rockpile seats cost a dollar each.

During construction, workers discovered a number of dinosaur fossils throughout the grounds. Rumors circulated that these fossils included a   triceratops skull. In reality, the fossil fragments discovered were quite small, and are now housed at the Museum of Science and Nature. Because of these discoveries, "Jurassic Park" was one of the first names to be considered for the stadium. This later led to the selection of a triceratops as the Rockies' mascot, Dinger.

Coors Brewing purchased naming rights to the stadium as part of their $30 million investment in the Rockies in 1991. A 2017 lease agreement that Rockies club ownership signed with the stadium district ensured that the name would remain at least through 2047.

Features

While most of the seats in Coors Field are dark green, the seats in the 20th row of the upper deck are purple to mark the elevation of one mile (5280 ft; 1,609 m) above sea level.

The Blue Moon Brewery at The Sandlot is a microbrewery/restaurant that is behind the right-field stands, with an entrance from Coors Field, and from Blake Street. The brewery is operated by the Coors Brewing Company, and experiments with craft beers on a small scale. The Brewery has won multiple awards at the Great American Beer Festival in various categories. The popular Blue Moon, a Belgian-Style Wheat beer was invented here, and is now mass-produced by Coors. The restaurant is housed in a building that is attached to the stadium. Coors Field has an extensive selection of food items. Selections include Rockie dogs, Denver dogs, vegetarian dogs and burgers, and all of the usual ball park items.

Behind the center field wall is a landscape decoration that reflects the typical environment of the Rocky Mountains. This landscape area consists of a waterfall, fountains, and pine trees.  After a Rockies home run or win, the fountains shoot high into the air.

The park has two large light emitting diode (LED) video displays and one ribbon display in the outfield from Daktronics. The top display, underneath the "Rockies" logo, measures . The second display measure  and is used to give lineups and statistics and as a scoreboard.

After the close of the 2013 season, renovations began on the right field portion of the upper deck, converted into an outdoor party deck for 2014.

Reputation as a home run-friendly park
Designers knew that the stadium would give up a lot of home runs, as the lower air density at such a high elevation would result in balls traveling farther than in other parks. To compensate for this, the outfield fences were placed at an unusually far distance from home plate, thus creating the largest outfield in Major League Baseball. In spite of the pushed-back fences, for many years Coors Field not only gave up the most home runs in baseball, but due to the resultant large field area, the most doubles and triples as well.

In its first decade, the above-average number of home runs earned Coors Field a reputation as the most hitter-friendly park in Major League Baseball, earning the critical nicknames "Coors Canaveral" (a reference to Cape Canaveral, from where NASA launches spacecraft) and "Williamsport" (referring to the site of the Little League World Series, which has been traditionally dominated by batters). Prior to the 2002 baseball season, studies determined that dry air rather than thin air had a greater contribution to the increased frequency of home runs. It was found that baseballs stored in damper air are softer and therefore less elastic to the impact of the bat. To address this problem, a secure room-sized humidor was installed to have a damper place to store the baseballs prior to games. Since its introduction, the number of home runs at Coors Field has decreased and is now nearly the same as other parks.

Regardless of ball humidity, elevation is still a factor in games at Coors Field.  The ball does slip more easily through the thin air allowing for longer hits. In addition, the curveball tends to curve less with the thin air than at sea level leading to fewer strikeouts and fewer effective pitches for pitchers to work with.

Coors Field twice broke the major league record for home runs hit in a ballpark in one season. The previous record, 248, had been set at the Angels' original home of Wrigley Field in Los Angeles in 1961, its only year for major league ball. In Coors Field's first year, the home run total fell just 7 short of that mark, despite losing 9 games from the home schedule (or 1/9 of the normal 81) due to the strike that had continued from 1994. The next season, 1996, with a full schedule finally, 271 home runs were hit at Coors Field. In 1999, the current major league record was set at 303. The annual home run figure dropped noticeably in 2002, and has dropped below 200 starting in 2005.

Although the number of home runs hit per season at Coors Field is decreasing, Coors Field still remains the most hitter friendly ballpark in the Major Leagues by a wide margin. From 2012 to 2015, the Colorado Rockies led the league in runs scored in home games, while being last in the league for runs scored in away games. This demonstrates the extreme benefit that Coors Field's low air density provides to hitters.

Many, however, feel that Coors Field has hurt the Rockies' success. One concern over the years has been poor adjustment when playing road games at lower altitudes. The Rockies score an average of just 3.9 runs per road game, the lowest among all teams. This has had a detrimental effect on Colorado's all-time road record, which sits at 888-1352, or 39.6%, the worst in the majors by a large margin. Additionally, many feel that pitcher development on the Rockies has suffered because of how much of an advantage opposing hitters have at Coors Field. Rockies pitchers are more likely to finish with an ERA of at least 4, if not higher, and only Ubaldo Jiménez and Jhoulys Chacín
maintained sub-4 ERAs during their Rockies tenure (3.66 and 3.84 respectively). This can hurt the trade value and careers of pitchers. Some have claimed that starting pitchers such as Kyle Freeland, Jon Gray, and Germán Márquez would have developed better if they didn't play for Colorado. Additionally, notable relief pitchers such as Jake McGee and Wade Davis are cited to have suffered significant drop-offs due to playing at higher altitudes. Compounded with poor coaching and management decisions, Colorado has gained a bad reputation among the pitching community, and some pitchers have cited their reluctance to play for the Rockies.

Notable events

MLB

On September 17, 1996, Hideo Nomo of the Los Angeles Dodgers threw the first of his two career no-hit games as the Dodgers won 9–0. Nomo's first no-hitter at Coors Field is of special note due to the park's overwhelming hitter-friendly reputation (before the usage of the humidors, even), it being the only one thrown there through the 2020 season, as well as Nomo pitching for the visiting team; while still a fairly new park at the time, the Rockies started out in the similarly elevated Mile High Stadium and would naturally be more accustomed to Coors Field's nuances such as the larger fielding area as it is their home field.

The 1998 and 2021 Major League Baseball All-Star Games took place in Coors Field.

In 2011, a man fell to his death when he was attempting to slide down a stair railing during the 7th inning of a Rockies-Diamondbacks game.

There have been ten 1–0 games in Coors Field history, through the 2018 season. The first 1–0 game at Coors Field was on July 9, 2005, meaning all ten games have occurred since Major League Baseball allowed the Rockies to start using a humidor on May 15, 2002:

July 9, 2005, Rockies beat the San Diego Padres
April 16, 2006, Philadelphia Phillies beat the Rockies
July 25, 2006, St. Louis Cardinals beat the Rockies
August 1, 2006, Milwaukee Brewers beat the Rockies
June 11, 2008, Rockies beat the San Francisco Giants
September 14, 2008, Rockies beat the Los Angeles Dodgers in 10 innings
September 17, 2008, Rockies beat the San Diego Padres
July 6, 2009, Rockies beat the Washington Nationals
June 12, 2010, Rockies beat the Toronto Blue Jays
July 4, 2018, Rockies beat the San Francisco Giants

Games 3 and 4 of the 2007 World Series between the Rockies and the Boston Red Sox were held at Coors Field. The Red Sox swept both games to win the title.

On August 7, 2016, Ichiro Suzuki collected his 3,000th MLB career hit: a seventh-inning triple that was off the right field wall off Rockies pitcher Chris Rusin.

Concerts

Ice Hockey

Coors Field also hosted three outdoor ice hockey games in February 2016. First, on February 20, the local Denver Pioneers defeated their arch-rival Colorado College 4–1 in a college match billed as the "Battle on Blake". Then, one week later on February 27, the Colorado Avalanche lost to the Detroit Red Wings 5–3 as part of the 2016 NHL Stadium Series. The day before that also hosted the Alumni exhibition game where the Colorado Avalanche alumni defeated their Detroit Red Wings counterparts.

The "Voice" of Coors Field
Alan Roach was the main PA announcer since Coors Field opened in 1995. In the spring preceding the 2007 Rockies season, Roach announced his retirement from his post at Coors Field to spend more time over the summer with his family. He did come back to substitute in 2008. Roach is also the PA announcer for the nearby Colorado Avalanche hockey team of the NHL and former PA announcer for the Denver Broncos of the NFL. He also provides voice-overs for local sports introductions in the region, in addition to hosting a local sports talk radio show. He is currently the PA announcer for the Minnesota Vikings of the NFL.  He is also one of the voices of the train system at Denver International Airport, and has also been heard as the PA announcer at recent Super Bowls. Reed Saunders, 23, was chosen to be the new voice of Coors Field on March 16, 2007.

In popular culture

Coors Field was featured in the movie The Fan (1996) starring Robert De Niro and Wesley Snipes. The ballpark was also featured in two episodes of South Park: "Professor Chaos" (2002) and "The Losing Edge" (2005).

"Acclaim Sports Park", featured on All-Star Baseball 2004 and 2005, is a mirrored image of Coors Field.

Coors Field firsts

Opening Day (April 26, 1995)

Later firsts

Notes

References

External links

Stadium site on MLB.com
Ballpark Digest visit to Coors Field
Ballparks of Baseball
Coors Field images and information

Major League Baseball venues
Sports venues in Denver
Sports venues completed in 1995
Colorado Rockies stadiums
Clock towers in Colorado
Baseball venues in Colorado
Ice hockey venues in Colorado
1995 establishments in Colorado
Populous (company) buildings